David Maia (born 18 October 1972) is a Portuguese wrestler. He competed in the men's Greco-Roman 57 kg at the 1996 Summer Olympics.

References

1972 births
Living people
Portuguese male sport wrestlers
Olympic wrestlers of Portugal
Wrestlers at the 1996 Summer Olympics
Sportspeople from Lisbon